Loch Eileen is a freshwater lakes located on the north slope of the Chiwaukum Mountains, in Chelan County, Washington. Self-issued Alpine Lake Wilderness permit required for transit within the Klonaqua Lakes area.

Loch Eileen sits on a highly glaciated and semibarren alpine basin, surrounded by heather and other wildflowers and a coniferous presence primarily larch pines.

History
Loch Eileen is one of the Scottish Lakes, which includes nearby Lake Julius, Lake Donald and Lake Ethel. The lakes were given names by Albert Hale Sylvester, a topographer for the United States Geological Survey working throughout the North Cascades National Park Complex around 1900,  named after female family and friends of Sylvester. Loche Eileen was named by Sylvester after the daughter of Forest Service Ranger Jason William.

See also 
 List of lakes of the Alpine Lakes Wilderness

References 

Lakes of Chelan County, Washington
Lakes of the Alpine Lakes Wilderness
Okanogan National Forest